Robert Reid (died 1558) was Abbot of Kinloss, Commendator-prior of Beauly, and Bishop of Orkney. He was born at Aikenhead in Clackmannan parish, the son of John Reid (killed at the Battle of Flodden) and Elizabeth Schanwell. His formal education began in 1511 at St Salvator's College in St Andrews University under the supervision of his uncle, Robert Schanwell, dean of the faculty of arts. Reid graduated in 1515 and by 1524 was subdean at Elgin Cathedral where, by 1527, he was Official of Moray. Thomas Chrystall, the abbot of Kinloss, chose Reid as his successor in 1526. In 1527, as abbot-designate, he attended the court of Pope Clement VII on abbacy business. While returning via Paris in 1528, Reid met the Piedmontese humanist scholar Giovanni Ferrerio who accompanied him back to Scotland. Following Chrystall's resignation in July 1528, Reid was blessed as abbot in September and received the Priory of Beauly, in commendam, in 1531. In that same year, Ferrerio left the court of James V to join Reid at Kinloss as tutor to the monks of both Kinloss and Beauly. Reid held many offices of state between 1532 and 1542 including ambassadorial roles to England and France and as a senior law official. He considerably improved the external and internal fabric of both monasteries in 1538.

In the spring of 1541, James V nominated Reid to the vacant bishopric of Orkney with his consecration taking place in late November. King James died in 1542 and James Hamilton, Earl of Arran was appointed regent during Queen Mary's minority. Bishop Reid aligned himself with Cardinal Beaton in his dislike of the pro-English stance of Arran. Beaton's resistance to the regent's viewpoint led to his arrest and the cardinal's supporters chose Reid to negotiate with Arran for Beaton's release in 1543. Reid's attempts were rejected but the cardinal's freedom was gradually restored. Despite his support of Beaton, Reid was elected to the influential Lord of the Articles committee of parliament. This position also brought with it membership of the regent's privy council. Parliament approved the Treaty of Greenwich, concluded in July 1543, that would pave the way to a betrothal between Queen Mary and Prince Edward of England. On 11 December, a renunciation of the treaty was passed by parliament and resulted in the English King Edward's declaration of war on Scotland that lasted nearly eight years and came to be known as the Rough Wooing.

In August 1544, Bishop Reid traveled to Kirkwall's St Magnus Cathedral, the seat of his Orkney bishopric, and immediately began structural improvements to the diocesan buildings and reforms to the cathedral chapter. Reid became President of the Court of Justice in February 1549. He relinquished his abbacy of Kinloss to his nephew Walter Reid in 1550 and that same year sat at the heresy trial of Adam Wallace. His services continued to be in demand and in June 1551 he was a commissioner appointed to treat for peace with England. In May 1554, Reid was a curator to the young Queen Mary. Shortly before embarking for France to attend the Queen's wedding to the Dauphin in 1558, Reid made out his last will and testament that allowed for a college to be established in Edinburgh that was to consist of grammar, arts and law schools with all necessary accommodation. Reid's ship was wrecked near Boulogne but both he and his fellow commissioner, the Earl of Rothes, survived to witness the royal marriage at Nôtre-Dame Cathedral. On reaching Dieppe on his journey home, Reid and fellow commissioners fell ill and on 6 September 1558, he died and was buried in Dieppe's church of St Jacques.

Early life 

Robert Reid's date of birth is unrecorded but he began his university education in 1511 and like most students of the time, entry usually occurred between the ages of twelve and fifteen—this would have placed his probable year of birth between 1496 and 1499. Robert's parents, John Reid and Elizabeth (sometimes known as Bessata) Schanwell, had six children of whom Robert was the third born—his two older brothers were David and James, and his three younger sisters were Christian, Helen and Margaret.Elizabeth Schanwell had at least three siblings—John who became abbot of Couper Angus, William who was a secular cleric, and Robert who in 1501 was Vicar of Kircaldy, and Dean of the faculty of arts at St Andrews University from 1512 to 1517. From 1517 to 1519 Robert Schanwell served as Deputy Rector and Rector of the University. Reid entered St Salvator's College in St Andrews University in 1511 during the period that his uncle, Robert Schanwell, held high office. Under the tutelage of Hugh Spens, Professor of Sacred Theology, he graduated as a Batchelor of Arts in 1513 or 1514 followed by his Master of Arts on 28 May 1515. St Salvador's College introduced the study of canon law as part of the curriculum in 1500 when it required that a Bachelor of Canon Law deliver three lectures per week. Hugh Spens had become a Doctor of Canon Law in 1508 but it was not until 1538 that degrees in civil law were offered. By the 1430s, for those aspiring to the higher echelons of the church or service to the king, or both, a postgraduate degree in canon or civil law was essential. Reid is almost always described as being a postgraduate law student at the University of Paris but no record of this has been uncovered. Moreover, Reid's future distinguished law career with expertise in both canon and civil law would rule out Paris as it was specifically barred from offering civil law. Instead, other universities provided this discipline; for instance, the University of Orlèans, situated only 110 km southwest of Paris offered a three-year course on civil law for those qualified in canon law.
Reid was appointed as a Notary public in the diocese of Moray in 1518 and then described as a court procurator in Fife and also as a cleric of St Andrews diocese, both in 1519. In 1520, he acted as a notary public of St Andrews diocese. He was subdean in the Diocese of Moray at Elgin Cathedral by 1524 and then officialis or official of the diocese by 1527—the official of a diocese was a lawyer who was the judge in the bishop's consistorial court and needed not only in-depth knowledge of canon law but frequently, civil law also.

Abbot of Kinloss 

The abbey of Kinloss, founded by King David I in 1151, is situated only a few miles from Elgin Cathedral where Robert Reid was its subdean and official, was governed by Abbot Thomas Crystall since his appointment on 13 January 1500. Chrystall had been very successful in retrieving misappropriated property belonging to the abbey and reinstating teinds that had been neglected and by doing so doubled the abbey income. Crystall performed numerous charitable acts in the distribution of alms and even provided impoverished ladies with money as dowries to enable suitable marriages.
The upkeep of his abbey properties was important to him, carrying out repairs and new building work at Kinloss while also improving the church furnishings and library. The external properties in Ellon and Strathisla were also well maintained. The additional income that Chrystall achieved allowed him to increase the numbers of monks from fourteen to twenty or more. Crystall was fully committed to the abbacy, refusing offers of elevation to the larger abbacies of Melrose and Dryburgh and then to the bishopric of Ross. Reid's own abilities were drawn upon by the Pope when he was chosen to resolve an internal church dispute between the Abbot of Cambuskenneth and the Vicar of Stirling in 1526. With the abbey's proximity to the cathedral, Chrystall was ideally placed to observe Reid at first-hand and so it was that it was the cathedral's subdean that he chose as his successor in 1526.

Rome was sacked on 6 May 1527 by the forces of Charles V, the Holy Roman Emperor, resulting in Pope Clement VII's imprisonment in the Castel Sant'Angelo. His release was finally negotiated and on 6 December 1527 he left Rome for the Umbrian city of Orvieto, 120 km to the North. Abbot-elect Reid faced a winter journey to meet the Pope, probably in the furtherance of his position at Kinloss, and left Elgin, ostensibly for Rome, sometime after 10 November 1527 but it may have been in Orvieto that he met the Pontiff. Reid's return journey took him via Paris where he was introduced to the humanist scholar Giovanni Ferrerio by the Scottish scholar and Augustinian canon, Robert Richardson. Following his studies at Turin, the Piedmontese Ferrerio arrived in Paris in 1525 where he became a companion of not only Richardson but other Scottish scholars such as Hector Boece, George Buchanan and William Gordon. Ferrerio joined Reid back to Scotland to the court of King James V where he would spend the next three years. In Pope Clement VII's bull of 4 July 1528, he acknowledged having received Chrystall's request to resign, which he granted, and declared that the appointment of a successor to any monastery within the see of Moray lay solely with him and that he had therefore appointed Reid, Abbot of Kinloss. This was conditional on Reid accepting the Cistercian monk's habit within six months of taking up the rule of the abbey; he received the habit and blessing from the bishop of Aberdeen at a ceremony at the church of the Grey Friars in Edinburgh in the autumn of 1528. Crystal retired to the tower house that he had built in 1525, at Strathisla in the abbey estates, having retained the fruits of the abbey. Crystall lived on for a further six years when he died at Strathisla on 29 December 1535 and was buried the next day at Kinloss.

One of Reid's first acts as abbot was to prosecute the nearby burgh of Forres to retrieve lands at Burgie and converted all of the abbey estates into a barony. The Barony of Muirton was created out of much of the abbey lands just north of the buildings. In 1531, Ferrerio was allowed to leave James's court to teach some of the Kinloss monks and, as a result of Reid having received, in commendam, the Priory of Beauly on 1 November, he also tutored five of the Beauly monks, seconded to Kinloss for a period of three years. Abbot Reid energetically set about renovations to the abbot's rooms, building arches in the cloister, providing the abbey with a fire-proof library, and having three chapels provided with altarpieces and adorned with murals; externally, he had the roof of the abbey sealed with a lead covering, provided new barns, a malthouse with an associated kiln and a dovecot.

Bishop of Orkney 

Robert Maxwell, Bishop of Orkney had died by 25 December 1540 and Robert Reid was nominated by the King for the bishopric on 5 April 1541.  The provision was granted on 20 July 1541 with Reid retaining his existing benefices including the abbacy of Kinloss. Like many other clerics, Reid, the politician, was more in evidence than Reid, the theologian.  But in 1544, once again back in his diocese, Reid rewrote the constitution of the diocese. This stipulated that there would be seven dignitaries led by a provost, seven canons, thirteen chaplains, and six choristers—the chancellor was charged with delivering a weekly lecture on canon law and one of the chaplains detailed to head up the grammar school.  Unusually, the Royal Burgh of Kirkwall owned St Magnes Cathedral given to it in a royal charter by James III] in 1486.  This charter stipulated that the income from the prebend of St John was to be used for the upkeep of the cathedral building and its contents but this was disregarded by Reid—other appropriations to finance this overhaul of the chapter were enforced. This channeled away revenues from parishes and risked the downgrading of the quality of pastoral care.

In 1541, Bishop Reid, as commendator of Beauly, had the bell-tower re-built after it had been ruined during a storm on 1 January. The nave of the priory church was renovated and the roof was protected with the addition of oak tiles. Further building works took place in 1544 when the old and ramshackle priory buildings were demolished and completely rebuilt with many improvements. In Orkney, evidence of the bishop's industriousness can be seen by the number of buildings that have Reid's coat of arms inserted into them—the most prominent of these being the restoration of the Bishop's Palace to which Reid had added a round tower in its northwest corner.

In 1554, Reid set about fine-tuning the diocesan organisation—in order to get ready for the divine services the chaplains and the choristers were re-housed and the subdean was allocated chambers that were better suited to his role of enforcing overall discipline when the provost was absent.

Diplomacy and judiciary 

The new College of Justice held its inaugural meeting on 27 May 1532 when Abbot Reid was admitted as a senator in place of his uncle, Robert Schanwell.  Alexander Mylne, the Abbot of Cambuskenneth, was appointed the College's first president and the king stipulated that Reid should act as its president upon Mylne's absence, "to minister thair in quhill hes returning." King James authorised William Stewart, Bishop of Aberdeen and Reid to negotiate a peace treaty with Henry VIII of England in February 1533 but it was 2 August 1534 before it was finally concluded. Ferrerio later wrote that Bishop Stewart and Abbot Reid were the only men capable of getting a "peace surpassing all expectation from an angry nation" (England). Reid was engaged in diplomatic work in France concerning the marriage of King James during 1535 and 1536, firstly with Marie de Bourbon and then with the sickly Madeleine, daughter of the French king. James and Madeleine married at Nôtre-Dame Cathedral in Paris on 1 January 1537 but the new Queen died within months at Holyrood Palace.

Reid was an envoy to Henry in 1541 and again in 1542 and on the latter instance was prevented from returning to the Scottish court and from writing to it until the preparations for war with Scotland were underway. In November 1542, Henry VIII had revived the English assertion of the overlordship of Scotland. King James died on 14 December 1542, and on 3 January 1543 James Hamilton, Earl of Arran, now heir presumptive, was appointed regent for the six-day-old Queen Mary.  Arran, holding pro-English views, had Beaton arrested.  It was against this backdrop that in March 1543, Reid was part of a gathering in Perth of like-minded nobles and churchmen who supported Beaton. It was agreed to send the bishop to meet Arran to call for the cardinal's release and for the ceasing of the circulation of English language versions of the New Testament, all of which were turned down. Arran called for a sitting of parliament in Edinburgh where despite his opposition to the regent's policies, Reid was appointed to the important Committee of the Articles. Reid continued to represent Beaton in his dealings with Arran who, with parliament, affirmed the treaties of Greenwich by which Queen Mary would, when she reached the age of ten, marry Prince Edward of England. Arran immediately began to vacillate and came to an agreement with the cardinal, went back on the Greenwich treaties, and repudiated his reforming principles. The pro-English lords led by the earls of Lennox and Angus met with Reid on 13 January 1544 and agreed to Beaton's terms allowing for a meeting with Regent Arran. The next day, on 17 January, the bishop was again meeting with Angus to finalise all remaining matters that existed between the earl and Arran.

Cardinal David Beaton was assassinated in his castle of St Andrews on 28 May 1546.  In response, Arran formed a small inner circle of four politicians to be readily available to him—Reid served on this council in June and July 1546 and then again in March 1547. He was also tasked with securing a doctor for Queen Mary and, it is thought, provided religious education to the monarch. Following the death of Abbot Alexander Mylne in 1548, Reid was appointed the Lord President of the College of Justice, appearing for the first time on 24 February 1549. The strategic Broughty Castle at the mouth of the River Tay had been in English hands since September 1547 but in February 1550 it had been retaken by a Joint French and Scottish force. The military successes in 1549 and 1550 prompted Reid, in his role as President of the College of Justice, to ensure that foreigners (i.e. the English) did not take their money with them but should spend it on Scottish goods. In the years 1550 to 1552, Reid was engaged in many legal and monetary matters but diplomatic duties were called on in 1552 when he was appointed one of the commissioners to negotiate a treaty with the young King Edward to end hostilities, define the border, the return of hostages and prisoners, and the exchange of criminals, among other things. On 12 April 1554 when the dowager queen, Mary of Guise, became regent for her daughter, Reid, as Queen Mary's curator, presented the necessary documents to parliament for endorsement. Again, Reid's ambassadorial experience was needed when, on 11 June 1557, he was one of the Scottish commissioners in Carlisle to treat for peace with England. France and Spain were now at war and with Mary, Queen of England and wife of Philip of Spain, France feared an alliance of England and Spain on the battlefield—dowager Queen Mary of Guise and regent, was now pushing for Scotland to enter the war on the side of France. This was resisted by the Scottish nobles but after an overwhelming French defeat by Spain at St Quentin, in Picardy on 10 August 1557, the marriage between Mary, Queen of Scots and the Dauphin now took on greater urgency.

Death 

In a letter dated 30 October 1557, Henry of France requested that the Scottish parliament send commissioners to prepare for the wedding of Queen Mary to the Dauphin of France—nine commissioners including Robert Reid were appointed to negotiate the wedding treaty.  On 6 February 1558—the day that he embarked for France—Reid concluded his last will and testament that allowed for a sum of 8000 merks to be used for the formation of a college in Edinburgh. Reid embarked on one of the ships of a small flotilla that had been assembled to transport the commissioners, personages with their horses and gifts for the wedding.   The weather was poor and even before they had left Scottish waters, one of the ships transporting the horses foundered and sank—another ship whose master was a Captain Watterton was wrecked as it approached the French coast with the loss of many gentlemen and valuable cargo. Reid and his fellow commissioner, the Earl of Rothes, were themselves shipwrecked near Boulogne and were rescued by a French fishing boat. On 11 April Bishop Reid and his fellow commissioners agreed on the marriage contract that protected Scotland's rights—this contract prevailed despite an attempt by the French to subvert the final outcome by obtaining an agreement directly with Queen Mary to Scotland's detriment. Mary's wedding took place on 24 April at Notre Dame Cathedral—the scene of her father's wedding to Madeline twenty-one years earlier.
An altercation took place between the council of France and the Scottish commissioners when the French demanded that the Regalia of Scotland be immediately sent to France so that the Dauphin could be crowned King of Scotland. Reid and his fellow commissioners refused by explaining that they had no mandate from the parliament of Scotland to agree to such terms. Displeased with this response, the French king prepared a letter of persuasion to the regent that two of the commissioners would deliver.  In the meantime, the other commissioners were kept back until the French were certain that the letter was successfully delivered—only at this point could Reid return to Scotland. Reid arrived at Dieppe at the end of August and started for home, only to be driven back in a gale, but by this time the bishop and four other commissioners were very ill.  They all died but Reid was the first on 6 September 1558 and was buried in the Chapel of St Andrew in the Church of St Jacques, in Dieppe.

Explanatory notes

References

Sources

External links 
 Cistercian Abbeys: KINLOSS
 Kinloss Abbey

1558 deaths
Bishops of Orkney
Cistercians
Scottish abbots
Scottish priors
Scottish Renaissance humanists
Founders of Scottish schools and colleges
Lords President of the Court of Session
Year of birth unknown
Alumni of the University of St Andrews
People associated with the University of Edinburgh
Scottish murder victims